is a city located in Ibaraki Prefecture, Japan. , the city had an estimated population of 174,219 in 78,209 households and a population density of 770 persons per km2. The percentage of the population aged over 65 was 32.7%. Hitachi is well known in the world for its brand name of electric products, including power plants and appliances, of the Hitachi company founded in the town in 1910 by Namihei Odaira with considerable properties as its factories in the city.

Geography
Located in northern Ibaraki Prefecture, Hitachi has a long coast along the Pacific Ocean to the east. Japan National Route 6 runs in parallel with the coast, connecting Tokyo and Sendai, and develops residential and commercial areas in the relatively narrow land of the coastal plain. Geologically the city covers Cambrian basement, some 500 million years old, with marble being quarried in the west for manufacturing cement material.

Surrounding municipalities
Ibaraki Prefecture
 Takahagi
 Hitachiōta
 Naka
 Tōkai

Climate
Hitachi has a Humid continental climate (Köppen Cfa) characterized by warm summers and cold winters with heavy snowfall.

Demographics
Per Japanese census data, the population of Hitachi peaked around 1980 and has steadily declined since.

History
Human settlement in the Hitachi area dates to at least the Japanese Paleolithic period. In the early Nara period, the area was defined as part of Taga Province, which was then merged into Hitachi Province under the Ritsuryō system. By the Sengoku period, the area was under the control of the Satake clan. Following the creation of the Tokugawa shogunate, Tokugawa Ieyasu ordered the Satake to Dewa Province, and the area became part of the domain's awarded to Ieyasu's son Tokugawa Yorifusa. The area remained part of Mito Domain until the Meiji restoration.

The village of Hitachi was formed on April 1, 1889 with the establishment of the modern municipalities system. The area rapidly developed towards the end of the Meiji period under the direction of Fusanosuke Kuhara of the Kuhara zaibatsu with the opening of copper mines, and under Namihei Odaira, the founder of Hitachi. The village of Hitachi was raised to town status on August 26, 1924. Hitachi and the neighboring town of Sukegawa merged on September 1, 1939, to form the city of Hitachi.

The city suffered from major damage in World War II, from shore bombardment by the United States Navy on July 17, 1945, and in air raids on June 10 and July 19. Hitachi was an important military target, as it was a major industrial center, which containing numerous factories of the Hitachi zaibatsu, especially connected with the production of electrical equipment. It also had a copper mine that contained 1/10 of all of Japan's copper. However, the bombardment was very inaccurate, and although civilian casualties were very high, the Hitachi factories were again largely left intact. The shore bombardment was followed by a second air raid with incendiary bombs on July 19.

In 1976 the disassembled MiG-25 fighter jet that Soviet pilot Viktor Belenko had defected in was returned to the Soviet Union from the port of Hitachi. It had been extensively examined at the nearby Hyakuri Air Base.

The borders of Hitachi expanded in 1955–1956 through the annexation of the neighboring villages of Hidaka, Sakamoto, Higashiosawa, Nakasato, Toyoura, the towns of Taga and Kuji. The Hitachi Copper Mine closed in 1981.

On November 1, 2004, the neighboring town of Jūō (from Taga District) was merged into Hitachi.

The city suffered from minor damage in the 2011 Tōhoku earthquake and tsunami with no fatalities reported.

Government
Hitachi has a mayor-council form of government with a directly elected mayor and a unicameral city council of 28 members. Hitachi contributes five members to the Ibaraki Prefectural Assembly. In terms of national politics, the city is part of Ibaraki 5th district of the lower house of the Diet of Japan.

Economy
Hitachi is a major industrial center, and is the former location of the headquarters of Hitachi and various of its group companies.

Education
Ibaraki University – engineering department
Ibaraki Christian University
Hitachi has 24 public elementary schools and 14 public middle schools and one public compulsory education schools operated by the city government. There are also one private elementary school and one private combined middle/high school. The Ibaraki prefectural Board of Education operates five public high schools and one combined middle/high school, in addition to one special education school. There are also four private high schools in the city.

Transportation

Railway
 JR East – Jōban Line
  –  –  –  –

Highway
  – Hitachi-Minamiota Interchange, Hitachi-Chuo Interchange, Hitachi-Kita Interchange

Local attractions
 Kamine Zoo
 Yoshida Tadashi Memorial Museum of Music

Sister city relations
 – Birmingham, Alabama, USA
 – Tauranga, Bay Of Plenty, New Zealand 
 – Kiryu, Gunma, Japan
 – Yamanobe, Yamagata, Japan

Noted people from Hitachi
Yukihisa Fujita, politician
Natsuo Yamaguchi, politician
Hiromitsu Agatsuma, musician
Kuniaki Shibata, boxer
Daishi Nobuyuki, sumo wrestler (Real Name: Nobuyuki Takano, Nihongo: 高野信行, Takano Nobuyuki)
Tagaryū Shōji, sumo wrestler (Real Name: Noboru Kurotani, Nihongo: 黒谷昇, Kurotani Noboru)
Tsubasa Aizawa, professional baseball player
Hironobu Sakaguchi, creator of Final Fantasy video game series

References

External links

Official Website 

 
Cities in Ibaraki Prefecture
Port settlements in Japan
Populated coastal places in Japan